The National Children's Center for Rural and Agricultural Health and Safety (NCCRAHS) is a part of the  National Farm Medicine Center, one of the research centers of the Marshfield Clinic Research Institute. The center is located  headquartered in Marshfield, Wisconsin, and is primarily funded by the National Institute for Occupational Safety and Health (NIOSH), which is part of the Centers for Disease Control and Prevention (CDC). The director is Barbara C. Lee, PhD.

History 
The National Children's Center for Rural and Agricultural Health and Safety (NCCRAHS) was established in 1997,  one of ten centers funded by the National Institute for Occupational Safety and Health. It is the only center with an exclusive child focus. The mission of the NCCRAHS is to "enhance the health and safety of all children exposed to hazards associated with agricultural work and rural environments".

Projects and products 
Agritourism began as a project to develop safety and health guidelines specific to children for farmers and operators of US agritourism businesses.   In 2007 the center created their first set of safety resources for agritourism operators and launched a new program – Integrating Safety into Agritourism, housed at www.SafeAgritourism.org.
Cultivate Safety is a website for farm parents. It houses materials, resources, and content specifically geared toward parents of children who work, live, or visit farms. Out of the campaign grew a "Parent First, Farmer Second" radio ad series that received the 2013 Plambeck Award, Best Series.
 Mini-grants are provided to organizations in the United States to support feasibility and pilot projects on prevention of childhood agricultural disease and injury.
 Model Policy is a voluntary guideline outlining best practices for employers that hire young workers. Information is included regarding the rationale for age-appropriate assignments, training needs for adolescent workers, ideal supervision, and mentoring by adult workers.
 North American Guidelines for Children's Agricultural Tasks is a collection of guidelines to assist parents and others in assigning age-appropriate tasks for children (ages 7–16) that live or work on ranches or farms in North America.
 Nurture is the center's newsletter.
 Safe Play was a project that designed the first comprehensive guidelines for constructing an outdoor safe play area on a farm.
 Safety Guidelines for Hired Adolescent Farmworkers is a series of seven posters giving advice on supervisor responsibilities for ensuring work conditions are appropriate and adequate. They are also used as an assessment tool for teen workers. These guidelines are available in English and Spanish.
 News Clippings data provides a source of injury and fatality data for researchers, academics, and government agencies. The center maintains the only publicly available database of news clippings data on injuries and deaths in agriculture, housed at www.AgInjuryNews.org.

References

External links 

 National Children's Center for Rural and Agricultural Health and Safety

1997 establishments in Wisconsin
Agriculture in Wisconsin
Health in Wisconsin
National Institute for Occupational Safety and Health
Non-profit organizations based in Wisconsin
Public health organizations
Research organizations in the United States
Wood County, Wisconsin